Baron Antoine Portal (January 5, 1742 – July 23, 1832) was a French anatomist, doctor, medical historian and founding president of the Académie Nationale de Médecine.

Biography
Born on January 5, 1742, in Gaillac, he was the eldest of 12 siblings. He studied at the Jesuit college in Albi followed by Toulouse and then attended the medical faculty in Montpellier between 1762 and 1765.

In 1766, Portal moved to Paris where he became a teacher of anatomy to the dauphin.  In 1769 he became professor of anatomy at the Collège de France and in 1778 was appointed to the prestigious position of professor of anatomy at the Jardin du Roi. Louis XVIII named him the first Doctor to the King, a post he served under Charles X as well. His close relationship with King Louis led in 1820 to the creation of what became the Académie Nationale de Médecine, of which he was lifelong president.

In 1803 he published "Cours d'anatomie médicale", a 5-volume work on medical history. He was probably the first to describe amyloid in liver in 1789 when he noted a lard-like substance in an elderly woman's liver. He was the first to describe bleeding due to esophageal varices. He also published article on clinical features of epilepsy.

He died in 1832 at the age of 90 and was buried in Saint Pierre de Montmartre.

References

French medical historians
People from Gaillac
1742 births
1832 deaths
French male non-fiction writers
Academic staff of the Collège de France
18th-century French physicians
Members of the French Academy of Sciences
French anatomists
18th-century French male writers